Wild Cards is a series of science fiction superhero shared universe anthologies, mosaic novels, and solo novels.  They are written by a collection of more than forty authors (referred to as the "Wild Cards Trust") and are edited by George R. R. Martin and Melinda M. Snodgrass. Set largely during an alternate history of post-World War II United States, the series follows humans who contracted the Wild Card virus, an alien virus that rewrites DNA and mutates survivors. Those who acquire crippling and/or repulsive physical conditions are known as Jokers, while those who acquire superhuman abilities are known as Aces, and those few who acquire minor, insignificant powers not worthy of being called aces are known as Deuces.

The series originated from a long-running campaign of the Superworld role-playing game, gamemastered by Martin and involving many of the original authors. The framework of the series was developed by Martin and Snodgrass, including the origin of the characters' superhuman abilities and the card-based terminology.

The first installment, Wild Cards, was released in January 1987 by Bantam Books and, as of August 2022, thirty books have been released through four publishers. The latest thirteen were released through Tor Books. The series has been adapted to comic books, graphic novels, and role-playing games.

Premise 

Set during an alternate history of post–World War II United States, the series follows events after an airborne alien virus is released over New York City in 1946 and eventually infects tens of thousands globally. The virus, designed to rewrite DNA, was developed as a bioweapon by a noble family on the planet Takis, and it is taken to Earth to test on humans, who are genetically identical to the people of Takis. Dr. Tachyon, a member of this family, objects and attempts to stop them. However, his attempt crashes their ship, releasing the virus.

The virus affects each individual differently, and it becomes known as the Wild Card virus because of these "random and unpredictable" symptoms. It kills 90% of those who contract it and mutates the remaining percentage. 9% survive but become Jokers, who develop minor or crippling physical conditions. The remaining 1% become Aces, who remain human or mostly human in appearance but develop superhuman abilities; Aces whose abilities are too trivial or specific to be generally valuable are called Deuces.

Origin 
Wild Cards began as a two-year-long campaign of the Superworld role-playing game, gifted to George R. R. Martin by Victor Milán, in Albuquerque, New Mexico; the players were science fiction writers, including Gail Gerstner-Miller, Milán, John J. Miller, Melinda M. Snodgrass, and Walter Jon Williams, and Martin served as gamemaster. Because of the amount of time and creative energy put into the campaign, Martin initially thought to write a novel on his character, Turtle. However, he realized this would have "rescued one character from [the] SuperWorld campaign, but would have meant discarding all the rest". Since the game had been built by a group, he felt it should be a shared universe anthology, which were popular at the time. Martin invited other writers he believed would be interested in the universe, including Roger Zelazny, Lewis Shiner, Pat Cadigan, Howard Waldrop, Edward Bryant, and Stephen Leigh.

Martin said that the group loved comic books and superheroes but wanted to approach the material in a "grittier, more adult manner than what we were seeing in the '80s". He cited the series' "sense of history" as a strength and expressed frustration with the retroactive continuity of mainstream comics. Martin also felt that the multitude of sources for superpowers in comics strained suspension of disbelief when taken together, and he believed a single plausible source was needed. Snodgrass suggested a virus, which allowed for the superpowered Aces, the "monsters and freaks" Jokers, and a high death toll. Snodgrass and Martin also developed the card based terminology, and Milán developed the pseudoscience of the series.

The series was originally meant to be set in a then contemporary 1985, but Waldrop, who was to write the first story, insisted that his story take place right after World War II. This created a forty-year gap between the first chapter and the remaining stories, pushing later contributions to fill in the intervening decades. Martin noted that this forced the authors to write about events they would have otherwise ignored, particularly the House Un-American Activities Committee and the McCarthy hearings which gave rise to characters and plot points that "added immeasurable richness to our world and depth of our characters". Waldrop's story also forced Williams to rewrite a new story, "Witness", which became the only shared world story to appear on the final ballot for a Nebula Award.

British writer Neil Gaiman met with Martin in 1987 and pitched a Wild Cards story about a character who lives in a world of dreams. Martin declined due to Gaiman's lack of prior credits at the time. Gaiman went on to publish his story as The Sandman.

Publishing history

Bantam Books (1987–1993)
Bantam Books, under its Spectra imprint, published twelve books between 1987 and 1993, including two solo novels written by Melinda M. Snodgrass and Victor Milán.

 1987 Wild Cards
 1987 Aces High
 1987 Jokers Wild
 1988 Aces Abroad
 1988 Down and Dirty
 1990 Ace in the Hole
 1990 Dead Man's Hand
 1991 One-Eyed Jacks
 1991 Jokertown Shuffle
 1992 Double Solitaire (novel by Snodgrass)
 1992 Dealer's Choice
 1993 Turn of the Cards (novel by Milán)

Baen Books (1993–1995) 
Baen Books published a new triad between 1993 and 1995 subtitled of a New Cycle. In 2002, Martin commented that he felt the triad was creatively "three of the strongest volumes Wild Cards ever had" and that the series "came back strong" after stumbling with a previous storyline; he conceded, however, that the triad was "very dark", acknowledging it was a commonly-voiced complaint, and that he felt switching publishers was a mistake.

 1993 Card Sharks
 1994 Marked Cards
 1995 Black Trump

ibooks Inc. (2002–2006) 
In 2000, ibooks Inc. purchased two new installments and the rights to reprint the first eight books of the series; the two new books were published between 2002 and 2006, including a solo novel by John J. Miller, and reprints for six of the first eight books were issued. The company filed for Chapter 7 bankruptcy in July 2005, shortly after the death of founder Byron Preiss. In December 2006, J. Bolyston & Co. Publishers, parent company of the Brick Tower Press imprint, acquired all of Preiss' assets, including those of ibooks, for $125,000. Brick Tower Press offered e-book versions of its titles, including Deuces Down and Death Draws Five via Humble Bundle in February 2016.

 2002 Deuces Down
 2006 Death Draws Five (novel by Miller)

Tor Books (2008–present) 
Tor Books, an imprint under Macmillan Publishers, currently publishes the series in both print and e-book format. It released ten new installments from November 2008 to August 2019. Tor Books has also reprinted the first twelve, sixteenth & seventeenth novel as of November 2021.

 2008 Inside Straight
 2008 Busted Flush
 2009 Suicide Kings
 2011 Fort Freak
 2014 Lowball
 2016 High Stakes
 2017 Mississippi Roll
 2018 Low Chicago
 2018 Texas Hold 'Em
 2019 Knaves Over Queens
 2021 Joker Moon
 2022 Three Kings
 2022 Full House

Upcoming books include Pairing Up, Sleeper Straddles and House Rules.

Tor Books also publishes online supplementary material. A multi-author blog supporting Inside Straight opened in February 2008. The blog followed American Hero, the fictional reality television show in the book, and posted in-character "confessionals" from the twenty-eight characters competing on the show. That supplemental material was republished by Tor as an e-book titled American Hero: A Wild Cards Novel on March 3, 2020.

Twenty-three short stories have been published through the Tor Books website from January 2013 through July 2022:

 2013 "When We Were Heroes" by Daniel Abraham
 2013 "The Button Man and the Murder Tree" by Cherie Priest
 2013 "The Elephant in the Room" by Paul Cornell
 2014 "Nuestra Señora de la Esperanza" by Carrie Vaughn
 2014 "Prompt. Professional. Pop!" by Walter Jon Williams
 2016 "Discards" by David D. Levine
 2016 "The Thing About Growing Up in Jokertown" by Carrie Vaughn
 2017 "The Atonement Tango" by Stephen Leigh
 2017 "When the Devil Drives" by Melissa Snodgrass
 2018 "EverNight" by Victor Milán
 2018 "The Flight of Morpho Girl" by Caroline Spector and Bradley Denton
 2018 "Fitting In" by Max Gladstone
 2019 "How to Move Spheres and Influence People" by Marko Kloos
 2019 "Long Is The Way" by Carrie Vaughn and Sage Walker
 2019 "The City That Never Sleeps" by Walton Simons
 2019 "Naked, Stoned, and Stabbed" by Bradley Denton
 2020 "The Visitor: Kill or Cure" by Mark Lawrence
 2020 "Berlin is Never Berlin" by Marko Kloos
2020 "Hammer and Tongs and a Rusty Nail" by Ian Tregillis
 2021 "Ripple Effects" by Laura J. Mixon
 2021 "Skin Deep" by Alan Brennert
 2022 "Hearts of Stone" by Emma Newman
 2022 "Grow" by Carrie Vaughn

A short story, titled "Lies My Mother Told Me" by Caroline Spector, was published in the Dangerous Women anthology, also edited by Martin. The anthology was released December 2013.

An additional short story, titled "I Have No Voice and I Must Zoom Meeting" by Paul Cornell, was published on the official Wild Cards website in July 2020.

Contributors 
The collection of authors who have contributed to the Wild Card series is known as the Wild Cards Trust or the Wild Card consortium. As of Joker Moon, published in July 2021, forty-four authors have written for the series. Five authors have written for at least one novel released by each publisher of the series: Michael Cassutt, Stephen Leigh (often writing as S. L. Farrell), John J. Miller, Walton Simons, and Snodgrass. Every installment was edited by Martin, who has also contributed as an author to ten books; later installments were co-edited by Snodgrass.

In other media

Role-playing games 

Wild Cards was adapted into a role-playing game format by Steve Jackson Games. Written by John J. Miller and published in June 1989, the sourcebook used GURPS Supers rules and contained descriptions of sixty of the characters. A supplement titled Aces Abroad, written by Kevin Andrew Murphy, was released in 1991. Green Ronin Publishing published Wild Cards Campaign Setting, written by Miller, for its Mutants & Masterminds RPG in August 2008; the game debuted at Gen Con that year. Two supplements were released: an adventure anthology titled All-in and a character book titled Aces & Jokers.

Comics 
A four-issue Wild Cards limited series was released in 1990 by Epic Comics, an imprint of Marvel Comics. The issues were then collected and published as a trade paperback in October 1991. They were also included in Epic: An Anthology, released in 1992. A second limited series titled Wild Cards: The Hard Call, written by Daniel Abraham and illustrated by Eric Battle, was published over six issues from April to September 2008 by Dabel Brothers Productions. Dabel Brothers partnered with Del Rey to collect the titles in July 2008, including Wild Cards: The Hard Call, as graphic novels beginning in fall 2008. The issues were collected in a hardcover edition published by Dynamite Entertainment in February 2011.

Marvel Entertainment began publishing a 4 issue comic book limited series Wild Cards: The Drawing of Cards scripted by Paul Cornell in July 2022. The series adapted material from the first Wild Cards novel.

Audiobooks 
Unabridged audiobook versions of the first five books have been released. Audiobooks of the first two installments were released by Brilliance Audio in November and December 2011. Versions of the third, fourth, and fifth novels were released by Penguin Random House from February to March 2016, featuring voice talents for each character. The sixth and seventh installments were released in February and June 2017. Commencing in August 2018, HarperAudio (UK) began releasing a new set of audiobooks in the series. The first three (Mississippi Roll, Low Chicago and Texas Hold'em) were narrated by William Hope. Next, Peter Noble narrated the two UK Wild Cards works (Knaves Over Queens and Three Kings). The sixth audiobook from HarperAudio (UK) (which was released in August 2021), Joker Moon, was performed by Aysha Kala. On a side note, in the UK, Three Kings has been released before Joker Moon, while the opposite is set to happen in the US.

Film 
In October 2011, Syfy Films, a joint venture between Syfy Channel and Universal Studios, acquired screen rights to Wild Cards under the direction of Gregory Noveck, senior vice president of production. Snodgrass was asked to write the screenplay, and she and Martin were to serve as executive producers. At the time of announcement, the film was intended to have a contemporary setting and the Sleeper among its characters. This was the second time the series was optioned.

Television 
In August 2016, Universal Cable Productions acquired the rights to create a television series. Martin stated that the development was in early stages and that the production was working on choosing characters and stories to adapt. Because of his exclusivity contract with HBO, which aired Game of Thrones based on Martin's A Song of Ice and Fire, Martin stated he will not be involved in the adaptation. Snodgrass is to serve as an executive producer. In a blog post, Martin said that Noveck is also to serve as an executive producer.

Universal Cable Productions was teaming up with Hulu in November 2018 to develop two series based on the novels to establish a potential connected Wild Cards universe for the streaming service, but as of 2021, the upcoming series was moved from Hulu to Peacock.

Explanatory notes

References

External links 
 
 Wild Cards series at Macmillan Publishers, parent company of Tor Books
 Wild Cards cover art gallery at Wild Cards official website
 Wild Cards at The Encyclopedia of Science Fiction
 Wild Cards Universe at the Internet Speculative Fiction Database

 
Book series introduced in 1987
Books by Chris Claremont
Novels by Roger Zelazny
Works by George R. R. Martin